Ernest Goes to Camp is a 1987 American comedy film directed by John Cherry and starring Jim Varney. It is the second film to feature the character of Ernest P. Worrell and was shot at Montgomery Bell State Park. It was also the first "Ernest" film to be distributed by Touchstone Pictures. This film also marks Iron Eyes Cody's final appearance on screen.

Plot
Long ago, a young Plains warrior is tested for initiation by being the target of three different weapons.

Centuries later, Ernest P. Worrell works as a maintenance man at Kamp Kikakee but hopes to become a counselor. He quickly becomes a valuable addition to the staff, as he is skilled at Plains Indian Sign Language, used by Kikakee's owner, Chief St. Cloud.

A small group of juvenile delinquents, the Second Chancers, come to Kikakee. Head Counselor Tipton assigns Kikakee's most experienced counselor, Ross Stennis, to be the boys' counselor. Stennis is unhappy with this assignment, and he treats the boys harshly. He ultimately goes too far by intentionally causing "Moose" Jones, the smallest boy in the group, to nearly drown in the lake while swimming. After Moose is rescued by Ernest, the boys retaliate against Stennis's cruelty by toppling his lifeguard perch into the lake, breaking Stennis' leg in the process. Since Stennis is no longer able to perform his duties as a counselor, and because Kikakee is already shorthanded, Tipton offers Stennis' position to Ernest. The trouble does not stop, as Pennington and his friends, other campers who harass Ernest, also target the new arrivals.

The Second Chancers initially give Ernest trouble, but they start to show some respect during a campfire session when Nurse St. Cloud, the Chief's granddaughter, translates her grandfather's description of the warrior initiation ritual for his tribe. The initiate must hold still while a knife, a stone hatchet, and an arrow are thrown or shot at him. The courage of the young warrior apparently alters the course of each weapon to prevent it from striking him. The Second Chancers later build a tepee only to see it get burned. They fight Pennington and his friends, because they were responsible for the fire. Tipton is poised to expel the Second Chancers, but Ernest convinces him otherwise.

Meanwhile, a mining corporation run by Sherman Krader wants to mine the petrocite at Kikakee, but Chief St. Cloud refuses to sell. Upon realizing that the Chief does not even understand English, Krader manipulates Ernest into obtaining the Chief's signature under false pretenses. Ernest, thinking that he is helping the Chief sign an anti-pollution petition, instead unknowingly convinces the Chief to sign the land away. Tipton sadly announces that the camp must close. Nurse St. Cloud confronts Ernest, who stammers that he will fix the situation.

Ernest and the Second Chancers storm onto the construction site and demand to see the boss. Krader is not present, but the foreman, Bronk is. Ernest tries to fight him, but Bronk brutally beats him up. The Second Chancers give up on Ernest and storm away. Later, Nurse St. Cloud overhears the kids demeaning Ernest's effort, so she reveals to them that Ernest is the only person who has defended them. They resolve to find him and apologize. They then form a plan to stop Krader and his construction crew.

Krader is prepared to demolish Kikakee, and while the regular staff and campers are sent home, Ernest and the Second Chancers openly attack the construction site to stall for time. They are joined by Chief St. Cloud, chefs Jake and Eddie, along with Pennington and Brooks, putting aside their rivalry. The group improvises some explosive weapons. Chief St. Cloud arrives to bless the fighters, although Nurse St. Cloud begs them not to go through with it. The assault quickly cripples the construction site's equipment. However, Bronk escapes in a bulldozer and destroys several camp buildings. The group stops him with Ernest's motorized maintenance cart filled with explosives, Ernest then knocks out Bronk.

Krader arrives on the scene with his lawyer, and then targets Ernest with his hunting rifle. Echoing Kikakee's ancient testimonial pow wow, Ernest faces down Krader and apparently passes the test as Krader takes three shots at him, missing every time. Ernest then plugs Krader's rifle with his finger and laughs in his face, signaling Krader's defeat. As Krader retreats, Nurse St. Cloud returns with a restraining order against the demolition.

Kamp Kikakee is once again operational, with all the campers and a full staff on site, plus, the last chance kids get to stay at camp. Nurse St. Cloud thanks Ernest for all he has done and reveals that Krader was ultimately arrested for fraud. Ernest is now a full-fledged counselor and also continues to perform his regular duties. As Ernest tries to rebuild the Kamp Kikakee sign, he ultimately falls and then the sign falls on him.

Cast

Production
Principal photography took place in Tennessee from September 3 until September 24, 1986.  About 150 local Boy Scouts were hired as extras and turtle wranglers. For the film's climatic battle, they gathered around twenty-five turtles from a Nashville pond.

Reception 
On review aggregator Rotten Tomatoes, the film has a "Fresh" rating of 62% based on 13 critics, with an average rating of 5.4/10, while on Metacritic, the film received a score of 24 based on 5 reviews, indicating "generally unfavorable reviews". Audiences polled by CinemaScore gave the film an average grade of "C+" on an A+ to F scale.

Box office 
Ernest Goes to Camp grossed $6.2 million in 1541 theaters its opening weekend. By its second week, it had made $3.6 million. It went on to gross a total of $23.5 million.

Home media
Originally released on VHS in 1987, with a re-issue in 1991 and a pan-and-scan Laserdisc release in 1992; this film's first DVD release was on September 3, 2002, from Touchstone Home Entertainment. Mill Creek Entertainment re-released it on January 18, 2011, as part of the two-disc set "Ernest Triple Feature" along with Ernest Goes to Jail and Ernest Scared Stupid. The Blu-ray was released on March 29, 2011, in a single disc Double Feature set along with Ernest Goes to Jail, and later on its own Blu-ray on June 13, 2011. A second Blu-ray double feature with Camp Nowhere was released on March 26, 2013.

References

External links

 
 
 

1987 comedy films
1987 films
American children's comedy films
Ernest P. Worrell films
Films directed by John R. Cherry III
Films shot in Tennessee
Works based on advertisements
Films about summer camps
Touchstone Pictures films
Native Americans in popular culture
1980s English-language films
1980s American films